Fuad Muradov (born 22 July 1979, in Baku, Azerbaijan), from 1986 to 1996 studied in 6th secondary school in Baku. He is the Chairman of the State Committee on Work with Diaspora. He has graduated from the Industrial Heat Engineering Department of the Azerbaijan State Oil Academy. Holds master's degree on Environment and Oil Industry from Joint Master Program of the Azerbaijan State Oil Academy, University of Nice (France) and University of Genoa (Italy)  in the framework of the EU Tempus Program . Holds Ph.D. in chemistry. He is the author of 10 scientific works and monographs, speaks English, French and Russian.

Since 2001 he is the manager of “ACEP” Azerbaijan Center of Environmental Projects, since 2002 chair of budget control commission of the European Youth Forum, since 2004 Chairman of the National Council of the Youth Organizations of the Republic of Azerbaijan (NAYORA).

On 6 November 2005, he was elected as Member of Parliament (Milli Mejlis) from Sabail Constituency No 29; 
Since 2005: 
•	Member of the Standing Commission of the Milli Mejlis on Human Rights; 
•	Head of the working group on interparliamentary relations between Azerbaijan and Malaysia; 
•	Member of the working groups on interparliamentary relations between Azerbaijan-Belgium, Azerbaijan-UK, Azerbaijan-India, Azerbaijan-Kuwait and Azerbaijan-Uzbekistan.

Since 2006 Fuad Muradov is the Member of the Initiative Group for South Caucasus Parliament, since 2008 the Member of the United Nations Convention Against Corruption Global Task Force within the GOPAC (The Global Organization of Parliamentarians Against Corruption's).2006.

In 2010 he was re-elected to the Parliament of Azerbaijan from Sabail Constituency No 29; 
Since 2010:
•	Former Member of the Standing Commission of the Milli Mejlis on Natural Resources, Energy and Environmental Issues 
•	Former Deputy head of the EU-Azerbaijan parliamentary cooperation committee 
•	Former Head of the working group on interparliamentary relations between Azerbaijan and Lithuania  
•	Former Member of the working groups on interparliamentary relations between Azerbaijan-France, Azerbaijan-UK, Azerbaijan-Germany, Azerbaijan-USA, Azerbaijan-Belgium, Azerbaijan-India, Azerbaijan-Kuwait.

Since 2011, he is the co-chairman of the Energy Security Committee of the EURONEST Parliamentary Assembly; member of the “New leaders for tomorrow” community of Crans Montana Forum. Member of the working group on development of the draft State Program on Azerbaijani Youth in 2011–2015. 
Since 28 June 2012 Fuad Muradov is the Chairman of the “Great Silk Way” International Youth Union. 
He is married, has 2 children.

References

1979 births
Living people
Members of the National Assembly (Azerbaijan)